The Gesuati Altarpiece is a 1444 tempera and gold on poplar panel altarpiece by Sano di Pietro, produced for San Girolamo, a Jesuati monastery in Siena. Most of its panels are now in the Pinacoteca Nazionale in Siena, although the six panels of the predella showing scenes from the life of Saint Jerome were lost to the Campana collection, later bought for the musée Napoléon III, which became the Louvre Museum, where these panels still hang.

The main panel shows the Madonna and Child enthroned flanked by six angels, with Blessed Giovanni Colombini (founder of the Jesuati order) kneeling in prayer before them. Beside it are four panels with full length figures of Saint Dominic, Saint Jerome, Augustine of Hippo and Francis of Assisi. Down the outer left-hand edge are three panels showing (from bottom to top) saints Peter, Anthony Abbot and Mary Magdalene, with an equivalent set down the right-hand edge James the Great, Ephrem the Syrian and Catherine of Alexandria. 

The central top register shows Christ the Redeemer enthroned and blessing, flanked by double pairs of seraphim with coloured wings. Either side are four more panels showing an Annunciation and Saints Cosmas and Damian. The predella scenes show (from left to right) Jerome's dream, Jerome's penitence, Jerome taking the thorn from the lion's paw, Jerome's death and Cyril of Jerusalem's vision of Jerome.

References

1444 paintings
Angels in art
Paintings in the Louvre by Italian artists
Paintings of Jerome
Paintings depicting Saint Peter
Paintings of Saints Cosmas and Damian
Paintings in the Pinacoteca Nazionale (Siena)
Paintings of Saint Dominic
Paintings of Anthony the Great
Paintings of Francis of Assisi
Paintings of Augustine of Hippo
Paintings depicting Mary Magdalene
Paintings of James the Great
Paintings of the Madonna and Child
Paintings depicting the Annunciation
Paintings of Catherine of Alexandria